KaBoom may refer to:
KaBOOM! (non-profit organization)
KaBOOM! (publisher), an imprint of the U.S. comics publisher Boom! Studios
The Australian name of the Wonka Xploder chocolate bar

See also
Kaboom (disambiguation)